Ahuva Gray (née Delores Gray) is a writer on religion and memoirist. She is a former Baptist minister who converted to Judaism and chronicled her changing beliefs in the book My Sister, the Jew, published in 2001.

Biography
Gray is African-American and was born to a Baptist working-class family in the Lawndale neighborhood of Chicago. She is a relative of baseball player Lorenzo Gray.

Gray worked for 23 years as a flight attendant, living in Los Angeles. She came a Baptist minister.  She began to doubt Christianity when she found what she believed were discrepancies in the New Testament. Her discovery prompted a process of searching for a renewed faith. Eventually she found and studied Judaism; Gray believed that the Torah made the most sense. In 1996, she gave up her position as a Christian minister and completed conversion to become an Orthodox Jew. She took the name of Ahuva.

She has written a book about this journey, entitled My Sister, the Jew (2001).

Since the late 20th century, Gray has lived in Bayit VeGan, Jerusalem.

References

Bibliography
My Sister the Jew Philipp Feldheim Inc, (2001)

External links 
 http://www.jewishmag.com/64mag/ahuva/ahuva.htm
 http://www.aish.com/ci/a/48943156.html
 http://www.jewishjournal.com/community_briefs/article/from_baptist_to_beshert_20010406/
 http://www.aish.com/societyWork/arts/From_Mississippi_to_Mount_Sinai.asp

American Orthodox Jews
Converts to Judaism from Baptist denominations
Converts to Orthodox Judaism
Living people
Year of birth missing (living people)
American emigrants to Israel
Israeli people of African-American descent
African-American Jews
African-American former Christians
Jewish women writers
Flight attendants
American women writers
African-American women writers
21st-century African-American people
21st-century African-American women